The 2003 Campeonato Ecuatoriano de Fútbol de la Serie A (known as the 2003 Copa Pílsener Serie A for sponsorship reasons) was the 46th season of the Serie A, the top level of professional football in Ecuador. LDU Quito won its seventh national championship.

Format
The tournament for this season was composed of three stages:

The First Stage and Second Stages are identical. The ten teams competed in a double round-robin tournament, one game at home and one away. The top three teams in each stage qualified to the Liguilla Final with bonus points (3, 2, and 1 point[s], respectively). At the end of the Second Stage, the team with the fewest points in the aggregate table were relegated to the Serie B. 

The Liguilla Final was a double round-robin tournament between the six qualified teams of the First and Second Stage. The winner of the Liguilla Final was crowned the Serie A champion. The champion, runner-up, and third-place finisher qualified to the 2004 Copa Libertadores.

First stage

Second stage

Aggregate table

Liguilla Final

External links
2003 season on RSSSF

2003
Ecu
Football